Cornershop are an English indie rock band best known for their single "Brimful of Asha", originally released in 1997 and, in a remixed version, topping the UK chart in 1998. The band was formed in 1991 by Wolverhampton-born Tjinder Singh (singer, songwriter, and guitar), his brother Avtar Singh (bass guitar, vocals), David Chambers (drums) and Ben Ayres (guitar, keyboards, and tamboura), the first three having previously been members of Preston-based band General Havoc, who released one single (the Fast Jaspal EP) in 1991. The band name originated from a stereotype referring to British Asians often owning corner shops. Their music is a fusion of Indian music, indie rock, alternative and electronic dance music.

History

Formation and early years: 1991–1996
Tjinder Singh formed the General Havoc whilst a student at Lancashire Polytechnic in Preston, in 1987. He relocated to Leicester, where his brother and sister lived, and formed Cornershop in 1991 along with his brother Avtar, and Chambers and Ayres, while working as a barman at Leicester's Magazine pub, also a popular local music venue. The band played their first gig at Leicester's O'Jays venue.
In the early 1990s, when singer Morrissey was being vilified by the UK music press after accusations of racism, the band were invited to comment and the Melody Maker ran a story featuring the band burning a picture of the singer outside the offices of EMI.

Their debut release, the In The Days of Ford Cortina EP, was pressed on "curry-coloured vinyl" and contained a blend of Indian-tinged noise pop. The sound mellowed somewhat with the release of debut album Hold On It Hurts in 1994, described by Trouser Press as "a politically charged popfest, ten tracks of noisy delights that meld incisive social commentary with a firm hold on British post-punk." The album impressed David Byrne sufficiently for him to sign the band to his Luaka Bop label. Although David Chambers left the band in 1994, replaced by Nick Simms, the band re-emerged in 1995 with the "6 a.m. Jullandar Shere" single and the album Woman's Gotta Have It, also touring the United States including some dates on the Lollapalooza tour. The band also toured Europe with Beck, Stereolab and Oasis.

Mainstream success: 1997–2001
The band released their critically acclaimed album When I Was Born for the 7th Time in September 1997. The album featured collaborations with Allen Ginsberg, Paula Frazer, Justin Warfield and a Yoko Ono- and Paul McCartney-approved cover of "Norwegian Wood" recorded in the Punjabi language. The album was produced by Tjinder Singh and Dan the Automator. Rolling Stone called it one of the essential recordings of the 1990s. The album was ranked No. 1 on Spin's list of 'Top 20 Albums of the Year' (1998)

The track "Brimful of Asha" topped the legendary Festive 50 rundown of John Peel's tracks of the year in 1997.

Norman Cook (a.k.a. Fatboy Slim) loved the track and remixed the song, which became hugely popular and captured the attention of the world. The song was a tribute to the prolific Indian playback singer, Asha Bhosle, and Tjinder's musical influences such as Trojan Records and vinyl culture in general.

In 2000 Ayres and Singh released a disco inspired album Disco and the Halfway to Discontent as part of their side-project, Clinton. This album inspired the launch of the London-based clubnight called Buttoned Down Disco, which took its name from the third track on the album.

Further success: 2002–2010
Their next official Cornershop release was the 2002 album, Handcream for a Generation, which featured Noel Gallagher on guitar.

According to their official website, Cornershop have been making a film about London's independent music industry since 2003. In 2004 the band released the track 'Topknot' featuring the vocals of Bubbley Kaur on Rough Trade Records. In February 2006, some four years after their last album, they released another single "Wop the Groove" featuring guest vocals from Happy Mondays backing singer Rowetta.

In 2008, their song "Candyman" was featured in the Nike advertisement for the LeBron James VI shoe, called the Six "Chalk" commercial.

Cornershop released an album Judy Sucks a Lemon for Breakfast in July 2009, preceded by the single "The Roll-Off Characteristics (Of History in the Making)" in May on their own record label called Ample Play.

Recent years: 2011–present
In 2011, Cornershop were awarded a prize for Commitment to Scene in the UK Asian Music Awards.

An album Cornershop and the Double 'O' Groove Of, a collaboration with Punjabi folk singer Bubbley Kaur, was released in March 2011 to critical acclaim in the UK. The band also set up the Singhles Club Club, a subscription service featuring a series of musically diverse collaborations and exclusive digital artwork.

The band's eighth album Urban Turban was released on 14 May 2012 and the ninth album Hold On It's Easy was released on 2 February 2015. In July 2015 they released a single "Pinpoint" with Welsh singer Angharad Van Rijswijk aka Accü 

In 2017 they gave an instrumental track called 'Demon is a Monster' to the anti-Brexit podcast 'Remainiacs' to use as a theme tune. The track was then released digitally. Cornershop were fiercely anti-Brexit. In March 2020, they released a new album, England Is a Garden to generally positive reviews. The first official video from the album accompanying the track 'St Marie under Canon' was released in February 2020.

Band members
Current members
 Tjinder Singh – vocals, guitars, bass, dholki (1991–present)
 Ben Ayres –  guitars, tamboura, keyboards, tambourine, vocals (1991–present)
 Nick Simms – drums, vocals (1995–present)
 Peter Bengry – percussion (1995–present)
 Adam Blake – sitar, guitars (2009–present)
 Pete Downing – guitars (2009–present)
 James Milne – bass 

Former members
 Avtar Singh – bass, guitars, vocals (1991–1995)
 David Chambers – drums (1991–1995)
 Anthony "Saffs" Saffery – sitar, guitars, keyboards (1994–2002)
 Wallis Healey – guitars (1994–1995)
 Pete Hall – percussion (1995)

Discography

Albums

Compilations

Singles and EPs

References

Further reading 
 Cornershop's Tjinder Singh: 'My dad said, 'They’ll not always want you here'. That stuck' by Jude Rogers.  The Guardian. 1 March 2020

External links

Musical groups established in 1991
1991 establishments in the United Kingdom
English alternative rock groups
Alternative dance musical groups
English indie rock groups
Britpop groups
Rough Trade Records artists
Musical groups from Leicester